Maria Vasilkova (born February 13, 1978, Megion, Tyumen Oblast) is a Russian politician from United Russia and a deputy of the 8th State Duma.
 
From 2008 to 2011, Vasilkova worked as the general director of the Moscow investment company Analysis. Finance. Investments LLC. She left the post to become financial director of Sokolskaya slab company - OSB LLC. In 2014-2021, she was the senior investment director of AFK Sistema and vice president of strategy. Since September 2021, she has served as deputy of the 8th State Duma.
 
She is sanctioned by the Biden Administration.

References 

1978 births
Living people
United Russia politicians
Eighth convocation members of the State Duma (Russian Federation)
21st-century Russian politicians
21st-century Russian women politicians
Russian individuals subject to the U.S. Department of the Treasury sanctions
Russian Presidential Academy of National Economy and Public Administration alumni